The Konzertvereinigung Wiener Staatsopernchor is an Austrian mixed choir of classical music and is formed by members from the Chor der Wiener Staatsoper.

History 
In 1927, Viktor Maiwald, a chorus member of the Vienna State Opera, founded the Concert Association of the Vienna State Opera Chorus in order to give the ensemble a stage presence outside the house – in the style of the Vienna Philharmonic Orchestra, which had already become independent in 1842 from the Vienna State Opera Orchestra for its own external concerts.

The choir is organised in self-administration and elects four board members, in detail a treasurer, managing director, secretary and the executive board, as well as an extended board consisting of eight voice representatives of the individual voice groups to represent their interests. who also perform representative tasks. Since its founding, the Concert Association has also appointed its own concert director from conductors with close ties to it. These include Karl Böhm, Claudio Abbado and three-time Clemens Krauss.

The choir accepts engagements for television productions, recordings and concerts. Especially the intensive participation with several simultaneous productions at the Salzburg Festival make it necessary under certain circumstances to recruit substitutes, who are selected for reinforcement after the audition selection procedure.

Concert directors

Recordings (selection) 
 Claude Debussy: Pelléas et Mélisande conductor Claudio Abbado
 Johannes Brahms: Ein deutsches Requiem conductor Carlo Maria Giulini
 Wolfgang Amadeus Mozart: Requiem conductor Karl Böhm
 Richard Wagner: Lohengrin conductor Claudio Abbado
 Giuseppe Verdi: Un ballo in maschera conductor Herbert von Karajan

References

Further reading

External links 
 
 
 Homepage
 

Austrian choirs
1927 establishments in Germany